Jaydev Niranjan Shah (born 4 May 1983) is an Indian former cricketer. Jaydev is the son of Niranjan Shah, ex-secretary of the Board of Control for Cricket in India, and represented Saurashtra cricket team in India's domestic circuit. He has the distinction of captaining Saurashtra to victory in the 2007-08 Vijay Hazare Trophy, the team's first ever national-level title. He was recruited by the Rajasthan Royals for the Indian Premier League 2008 edition, but never played, and has also represented Rajasthan Cricket Association President's XI in the past.

On 21 October 2016, he became the first captain of Saurashtra to score a double century, when he made 217 runs in their Ranji Trophy match against Maharashtra.

In December 2018, he announced that he would retire from all cricket following the Saurashtra's match against Karnataka in round five of the 2018–19 Ranji Trophy. He made match winning 97 runs in his final professional game against Karnataka.

References

1983 births
Living people
People from Rajkot
Indian cricketers
Saurashtra cricketers
Mumbai Indians cricketers
India Red cricketers
Gujarat Lions cricketers
Deccan Chargers cricketers